Madhava's correction term is a mathematical expression attributed to Madhava of Sangamagrama (c. 1340 – c. 1425), the founder of the Kerala school of astronomy and mathematics, that can be used to give a better approximation to the value of the mathematical constant π (pi) than the partial sum approximation obtained by truncating the Madhava-Leibnitz infinite series for π. The Madhava-Leibniz infinite series for π is

 

Taking the partial sum of the first  terms we have the following approximation to :

 

  

 

In the extant writings of the mathematicians of the Kerala school there are some indications regarding how the correction terms  and  have been obtained, but there are no indications on how the expression  has been obtained. This has led to a lot of speculative work on how the formulas might have been derived.

Correction terms as given in Kerala texts

The Yuktidipika-Laghuvivrthi commentary of Tantrasangraha, a treatise written by Nilakantha Somayaji an astronomer/mathematician belonging to the Kerala school of astronomy and mathematics and completed in 1501, presents the second correction term in the following verses (Chapter 2: Verses 271 - 274):

English translation of the verses:

"To the diameter multiplied by 4 alternately add and subtract in order the diam­eter multiplied by 4 and divided separately by the odd numbers 3, 5, etc. That odd number at which this process ends, four times the diameter should be mul­tiplied by the next even number, halved and [then] divided by one added to that [even] number squared. The result is to be added or subtracted according as the last term was subtracted or added. This gives the circumference more accurately than would be obtained by going on with that process."

In modern notations this can be stated as follows (where  is the diameter of the circle):

 Circumference 

The same commentary also gives the correction term  in the following verses (Chapter 2: Verses 295 - 296):

English translation of the verses:

"A subtler method, with another correction. [Retain] the first procedure involving division of four times the diameter by the odd numbers, 3, 5, etc. [But] then add or subtract it [four times the diameter] multiplied by one added to the next even number halved and squared, and divided by one added to four times the preceding multiplier [with this] multiplied by the even number halved."

In modern notations, this can be stated as follows:

 Circumference 

Accuracy of the correction terms

Let

 .

Then, writing , it can be seen that the errors  have the following bounds:

Numerical values of the errors in the computation of π

Continued fraction expressions for the correction terms

It has been noted that the correction terms  are the first three convergents of the following continued fraction expressions:

The function  that renders the equation 

exact can be expressed in the following form:

The first three convergents of this infinite continued fraction are precisely the correction terms of Madhava. Also, this function  has the following property:

How the correction terms were obtained according to Hayashi et al

In a paper published in 1990, a group of three Japanese researchers proposed an ingenious method by which Madhava might have obtained the three correction terms.

Writing 

and taking  compute the following values:

These are then expressed as fractions with 1 as numerator as follows:

Ignoring the fractional parts in the denominator, the following approximations are obtained.

The fractions that were ignored are now expressed with 1 as numerator. The fractional parts in the denominators are ignored to get the following approximations:

The fractions that are ignored are once again expressed as fractions with 1 as numerator to get the following approximations.

See also
Madhava series
Madhava's sine table

References

Additional reading

 
 

Pi
History of calculus
Kerala school of astronomy and mathematics
Mathematical series